ABC 2000 Today was ABC News' special programming covering the new millennium celebrations  around the world from December 31, 1999, into January 1, 2000, as part of the 2000 Today programming in the United States. Peter Jennings anchored the 23 hours and 10 minutes of broadcast from Times Square Studios in Manhattan, New York. ABC temporarily converted the Good Morning America marquee broadcast studio into a type of "millennium command center" that included a desk, where a standing Jennings spent most of his time, two lounge chairs, where Jennings would interview guests, a large screen with a time-zone included map of the world, a wall of clocks, and a makeshift newsroom where ABC News staffers would follow the latest developments.

Correspondents and guests
Jack Ford was stationed in Times Square throughout the broadcast, and was also joined by entertainer Dick Clark (the creator and host of his namesake New Year's Rockin' Eve, which did not air due to ABC 2000 Today) as a correspondent to conduct his traditional countdown. Other correspondents were Charles Gibson in London, Diane Sawyer in New York, Barbara Walters in Paris, Sam Donaldson at the Y2K Command Center in Washington, Connie Chung in Las Vegas, Deborah Roberts at Walt Disney World, Morton Dean in Moscow, and literally hundreds of others at ABC News, technicians and newsmen, who worked throughout the day to bring the broadcast. Those hundreds of others included ABC News personalities stationed around the world to cover the new year in every time zone, including Elizabeth Vargas in Sydney, Australia, Cokie Roberts at the Vatican, with her mother Lindy Boggs, the then U.S. Ambassador to the Vatican, Carole Simpson in Chicago, John Quiñones in Miami, and Bob Brown, who narrated many segments consolidating the day's events. Local stations also featured their own coverage during time local breaks, which varied from traditional breaks for local news and weather to full-scale coverage of local countdowns and possible Y2K bug effects (which in ABC and local coverage, eventually became minimal as little to any issues came out of that).

ABC had a total of more than 1,000 members of their news division part of the broadcast.  They were all under the direction of ABC's Roger Goodman.

Guests included famed Australian comedian Barry Humphries in character as Dame Edna, David Blane, comedian Al Franken, and longtime ABC anchor Howard K. Smith. Musical performances included the Bee Gees, Neil Diamond, Faith Hill, Enrique Iglesias, Kenny G, Charlotte Church, Billy Joel, Barry Manilow, Bonnie Raitt, *NSYNC, James Taylor, Christina Aguilera (who performed at the MTV studios across the street), Aerosmith, and Phish. Phish's appearance was live via satellite from their Big Cypress festival. The performances by the Bee Gees, Phish, Charlotte Church, and Kenny G were selected to appear in the international 2000 Today program.

Broadcast highlights

Originally, the name of the broadcast was ABC 2000, but it was officially retitled as ABC 2000 Today because ABC joined 60 other nations, all celebrating the dawn of the new millennium. The network was part of the 2000 Today consortium that included PBS, WGBH, the BBC in the United Kingdom, ATV in Hong Kong, RCTI in Indonesia, RTM in Malaysia, CCTV in China, TCS and Singapore Television Twelve in Singapore, ABC in Australia, TV Asahi in Japan, MBC in South Korea, SABC in South Africa, TVE in Spain, Rede Record in Brazil, GMA Network in the Philippines, RTL in Germany, RTP in Portugal, TV3 in New Zealand, Televisa and Once TV in Mexico, TVN in Chile, CBC and Radio-Canada in Canada, TF1 and France 2 in France, RAI in Italy, and RTÉ in Ireland. (The program was nonetheless consistently promoted under the ABC 2000 name, possibly to avoid confusion with the U.S. morning show Today, which airs on rival network NBC.)

This was by far the most comprehensive coverage of any of the broadcast networks. By contrast, CBS had hourly updates throughout the day with Dan Rather, a special 8 pm edition of the Late Show with David Letterman and from 10pm-1am ET, Rather and actor and rapper Will Smith hosted America's Millennium live from Times Square and Washington D.C. respectively. It was the only time CBS offered live New Year coverage between the finale of Happy New Year, America (leading into 1996) and the debut of CBS New Year's Eve Live: Nashville's Big Bash (leading into 2022). NBC had an extended edition of The Today Show, Dateline NBC at 8 pm and from 9:00 pm-3:30 am ET, Tom Brokaw and Katie Couric anchored NBC's millennium coverage, which included a special edition of The Tonight Show with Jay Leno, which took part in the millennium celebrations in Los Angeles.

Peter Jennings stayed on the air for the entire duration without a break using only commercial breaks and correspondent pieces to rest, eat, or change suits. He changed his wardrobe four times, including wearing a tuxedo when the ball was dropping at Times Square, and a sweater at the end of the ABC 2000 Today broadcast.

At least 175 million Americans tuned into some portions of ABC 2000 Today. The broadcast won a Peabody Award.

The theme music for ABC 2000 Today (which was also used for ABC News' election coverage that year) was from Epcot's IllumiNations: Reflections of Earth live show. The music was composed by Gavin Greenaway, who won an Emmy award for the work. Footage of IllumiNations: Reflections of Earth were shown in the opening and closing sequences.

Follow-up
ABC News also used Times Square Studios for ABC News's 2000 election coverage ABC 2000: The Vote, with the studio set up very similar to the ABC 2000 Today studio set up, except the large screen was used to show the map of the United States with all the red and blue states.

For 2002, ABC preceded the primetime hour of New Year's Rockin' Eve with a follow-up special, ABC 2002. The three-and-a-half-hour special featured a "meaningful and reflective" view on New Year's celebrations from around the world (especially in the wake of the September 11 attacks), and performances by Arlo Guthrie, Sting, and U2. It was hosted by Jennings from the Rose Center for Earth and Space in New York City.

References

External links
ABC News Store: 2000 Today (archived)

1999 television specials
2000 television specials
2000 in American television
1990s American television specials
2000s American television specials
ABC News
American Broadcasting Company original programming
Peabody Award-winning broadcasts
New Year's television specials
American Broadcasting Company television specials